Carl Ingvar Andersson (19 March 1899 – 14 October 1974)  was a Swedish historian and director of the National Archives of Sweden.

Andersson was an associate professor at Lund University from 1928 to 1938 and director of the National Archives from 1950 to 1965. Most of his historical research was focused on the 16th century. Among his works is a biography of Eric XIV of Sweden. In 1950 Andersson became a member of the Swedish Academy.

References

1899 births
1974 deaths
20th-century Swedish historians
Members of the Swedish Academy
Academic staff of Lund University
Members of the Royal Gustavus Adolphus Academy
Members of the Royal Swedish Academy of Sciences